The Strandzha Cup (also spelled Strandja Cup and officially known as the Strandja Memorial) is an international amateur boxing tournament held annually in Bulgaria. It often determines who will qualify to compete at the upcoming summer Olympic games. The Strandja Cup is the oldest international amateur boxing competition in Europe. The first tournament was held in 1950 at the "Yunak" stadium in Sofia. The trophy is awarded to the best boxer of the tournament. The first cup was awarded to Hristo Popov, born 1931.

Past editions of the tournament

Past Strandja Memorial Editions

Host cities
 Sofia - 41 times
 Plovdiv - 9 times
 Yambol - 6 times
 Gabrovo - 1 times
 Veliko Tarnovo - 1 times
 Pleven - 1 times
 Burgas - 1 times

Most successful fighters
 * means current champion
  Tsacho Andreikovski - 4 titles (1974, 1976, 1978, 1979)
  Daniel Petrov - 4 titles (1994, 1997, 1998, 1999)
  Serafim Todorov - 3 titles (1989, 1993, 1996)
 Beatriz Ferreira- 3 titles (2019, 2021,2023*)
 Amit Panghal- 2 titles (2018, 2019)

Notable participants
  Anatoli Bulakov
  Armando Martinez
  Petar Lesov
  Tontcho Tontchev
  Dimitar Stilianov
  Serafim Todorov
  Boris Georgiev
  Kubrat Pulev
  Amir Khan
  David Price
  Alexander Povetkin
  Roberto Cammarelle
  Billy Joe Saunders
  Oleksandr Usyk
  Wladimir Klitschko
  Félix Savón
  Ruslan Chagaev
  Vadim Musaev
  Beatriz Ferreira
Boxing competitions in Bulgaria